The Underneath, formerly known as Transtic Nerve, was a Japanese visual kei rock band formed in 1995. The band released four full-length records as Transtic Nerve and two full-length records as The Underneath. As Transtic Nerve, the band played more straightforward rock styled music, but in 2007 shifted to a heavier and darker style upon transforming to The Underneath. In 2010, the group disbanded and reformed (without second guitarist Tal) under the name Defspiral.

History 
Transtic Nerve was formed in November 1995 with the lineup of Tal on guitar, Ryo on bass and Masaki on drums. The band later recruited Taka as vocalist and Masato as second guitarist. The following August, Transtic Nerve released their debut album, Transtic Vision.

In 1998, the band was noticed by famed guitarist hide (formerly of X Japan) and signed to his label, Lemoned. However, due to hide's death soon after, the band was let go without having released anything on the label. The next year, Transtic Nerve released their first single, "Shindou", and their first major label album, Cell Flash, on Unlimited Records in July 1999.

In 2000, the band released two more singles, "Into Yourself" and "Binetsu", both accompanied by lengthy tours spanning most of the year. After touring, the band released another single, "Manazahi no Mukou e", followed by an album, Recall, in March 2001. After touring in support of Recall, the band released another single, "Manatsu no Yoru no Highway Star" in late 2001. Between 2002 and 2004, the band saw very few releases, with only one original studio album, Raise a Flag in 2004. Following their 2004 release, the band transitioned into a new style with more metal influence, and in 2005 Transtic Nerve released an EP, Hole in the Wall, demonstrating the new direction.

After a long pause in activity, Transtic Nerve resurfaced in 2007 with the announcement of a new band identity — the Underneath. The band saw no lineup change, but a deep stylistic change, moving to a heavier and darker style of music. The band's debut would be the Taste of Chaos 2008 tour across the United States, being one of the three Japanese rock bands featured on the years' lineup (the others being D'espairsRay and Mucc). Without any releases or concerts in their home country, the band performed a lengthy American tour. The Underneath eventually announced their first album, Moon Flower, to be released in March 2008, first in the United States on the newly formed JShock label, partly founded by Yoshiki of X Japan.

After the completion of the Taste of Chaos tour, the band performed for the first time in Japan at the hide memorial summit. There, they played on the second day of the festival, alongside fellow Taste of Chaos bands D'espairsRay and Mucc, and others including X Japan, Luna Sea and Dir en grey. The Underneath's first headlining performance in Japan took place on June 13, 2008 at Shibuya O-West.

The band played along with fellow Japanese groups MarBell and DaizyStripper at Otakon 2008, on August 10, 2008 in Baltimore, MD. In November 2009, they released their second album, entitled Us. in Japan.

The band announced that they would disband on May 3, 2010. They released one last single titled "Diamond" on March 17, and had a disbanding tour called Last Live 2010 "Last Scene".

All five members held a 15th anniversary concert as Transtic Nerve at Akasaka Blitz on December 28, 2014.

Members 
Taka – vocals
Tal – guitar
Masato – guitar
Ryo – bass
Masaki – drums

Discography

As Transtic Nerve 
Albums
Transonic Vision (1997)
Shell (1998) – Limited/Sonic Strider
Cell Flash (1999) – Unlimited/Massive
Recall (2001) – Unlimited/Massive
Raise a Flag (2004) – Master Tune

Extended plays
Metabolism – Master Tune
Metabolism No. 2 (2002) – Master Tune
The Moment of Metabolism (2002) – Master Tune
Metabolism No. 3 (2003) – Master Tune
Hole in the Wall (2005) – Master Tune

Singles
"Shindou" (1999)
"Wake Up Your Mind's "Jesus" (1999)
"Overhead Run" (1999)
"Into Yourself" (2000)
"Binetsu" (2000)
"Manazashi no Mukou e" (2001)
"Manatsu no Yoru no Highway Star" (2001)

As The Underneath 
Albums
Moon Flower (2008) – JShock (US), Stirring/Def Spiral (JP)
Us. (2009)

Singles
"Diamond" (2010)

References

External links 
Transtic Nerve official site
The Underneath official site

Visual kei musical groups
Japanese alternative rock groups
Japanese hard rock musical groups
Japanese heavy metal musical groups
Japanese punk rock groups
Musical groups established in 1995
Musical groups disestablished in 2010
Musical groups from Hyōgo Prefecture